The Invaluable Darkness is a live DVD by symphonic black metal band Dimmu Borgir. It was released on October 14, 2008.  The title comes from the closing track of In Sorte Diaboli, their eighth and most recent studio album at the time, despite the fact that the track does not appear on this release.

Track listing

DVD One:The Invaluable Darkness Tour - Europe 2007 

Sentrum Scene in Oslo, Norway – November 6, 2007:

Introduction
Progenies of the Great Apocalypse
The Serpentine Offering
The Chosen Legacy
Spellbound (By The Devil)
Sorgens Kammer Del II
The Insight And The Catharsis
Raabjørn Speiler Draugheimens Skodde
The Sacrilegious Scorn
Mourning Palace
The Fallen Arises

Columbiahalle in Berlin, Germany - October 21, 2007:

 The Sinister Awakening
A Succubus In Rapture
Fear & Wonder
Blessings Upon the Throne of Tyranny

The Forum in London, UK – September 28, 2007:

 Vredesbyrd
Puritania

II. Behind-The-Scenes Footage

III. Special Feature

DVD Two 

I. Wacken Open Air, Germany – Black Metal Stage – August 2, 2007

Introduction
Progenies of the Great Apocalypse
Vredesbyrd
Cataclysm Children
Kings Of The Carnival Creation
Sorgens Kammer Del II
Indoctrination
A Succubus In Rapture
The Serpentine Offering
The Chosen Legacy
The Insight And The Catharsis
Spellbound (By The Devil)
Mourning Palace
The Fallen Arises

II. P3 Session – NRK Studio 19 IN Oslo, Norway – September 18, 2007

The Serpentine Offering
Spellbound (By The Devil)
Mourning Palace

III. Video Gallery

Progenies of the Great Apocalypse
Vredesbyrd
Sorgens Kammer Del II
The Serpentine Offering
The Sacrilegious Scorn
The Chosen Legacy

IV. Gold Awards Oslo

V. Image Gallery

Bonus Audio CD 

P3 Session @ NRK Studio 19 in Oslo, Norway - September 18, 2007

Introduction
Progenies of the Great Apocalypse
Vredesbyrd
Sorgens Kammer Del II
Indoctrination
A Succubus In Rapture
The Serpentine Offering
The Chosen Legacy
The Insight And The Catharsis
Spellbound (By The Devil)
Mourning Palace
The Fallen Arises

Line-up on this DVD

Shagrath – lead vocals
Silenoz – rhythm guitar, lead guitar in "Sorgens Kammer Del II"
Galder – lead guitar
ICS Vortex – bass guitar, clean vocals
Mustis – keyboards, piano
Tony Laureano – drums

References
Blabbermouth.net

External links 
Nuclear Blast Records
The Invaluable Darkness DVD Premiere In Germany

Dimmu Borgir albums
Concept albums
2007 live albums
Live video albums
2007 video albums
Nuclear Blast video albums
Nuclear Blast live albums